A list of films produced in the Soviet Union in 1959 (see 1959 in film).

1959

See also
1959 in the Soviet Union

External links
 Soviet films of 1959 at the Internet Movie Database

1959
Soviet
Films